The Brit Award for Classical Recording was an award given by the British Phonographic Industry (BPI), an organisation which represents record companies and artists in the United Kingdom.

Criteria
The accolade used to be presented at the Brit Awards, an annual celebration of British and international music. The winners and nominees are determined by the Brit Awards voting academy with over one-thousand members, which comprise record labels, publishers, managers, agents, media, and previous winners and nominees.

History
The award was first presented in 1982 as awards as "Classical Recording" which were won by Simon Rattle.
The accolade has been defunct as of 1993.

Winners and nominees

Multiple nominations and awards

References

External links
Official website

Brit Awards
Classical music awards
Awards established in 1982
Awards disestablished in 1993